The 1996 Leekes British Open Championships was held at the Cardiff International Arena from 1–7 April 1996. Jansher Khan won his fifth consecutive title defeating Rodney Eyles in the final. The PSA decided there would only be eight seeds during this event.

Seeds

Draw and results

Main draw

References

Men's British Open Squash Championships
Men's British Open
Men's British Open Squash Championship
Men's British Open Squash Championship
Men's British Open Squash Championship
1990s in Cardiff
Sports competitions in Cardiff